Leptonchidae is a family of nematodes belonging to the order Dorylaimida.

Genera

Genera:
 Aculonchus Siddiqi, 1983
 Agmodorus Thorne, 1964
 Apoleptonchus Siddiqi, 1981

References

Nematodes